The 1904 election for Mayor of Los Angeles took place on December 5, 1904. Incumbent Meredith P. Snyder was defeated by Owen McAleer.

Results

References

External links
 Office of the City Clerk, City of Los Angeles

1904
1904 California elections
Los Angeles
1900s in Los Angeles